Skip Triplett was the president and CEO of Kwantlen Polytechnic University in Vancouver, British Columbia.

See also
Higher education in British Columbia

References

Canadian university and college chief executives
Kwantlen Polytechnic University
Living people
Year of birth missing (living people)
Place of birth missing (living people)